Isobel Mary Helen Cecilia Joyce (born 25 July 1983) is an Irish former  cricketer. She played as a right-handed batter and left-arm medium pace bowler. She appeared in one Test match, 79 One Day Internationals and 55 Twenty20 Internationals for Ireland between 1999 and 2018. She played in her final match for Ireland in November 2018, during the 2018 ICC Women's World Twenty20 tournament. She played domestic cricket for Scorchers, Tasmania and Hobart Hurricanes.

Playing career

Joyce made her debut for Ireland in a One-Day International (ODI) against India in Milton Keynes in June 1999. She then played in the Women's European Championship the following month. In 2000, she played four ODIs against Pakistan and played her only Test match, also against Pakistan. This is Ireland's only Test match to date. She played in the Women's World Cup in New Zealand towards the end of the year.

Since the 2000 World Cup, she has played ODIs against Australia, India, the Netherlands and New Zealand, also playing in the European Championship in 2001 and 2005, and in the IWCC Trophy in the Netherlands in 2003.

In April 2016, she stepped down as captain of the Ireland women's cricket team following their exit at the group stages of the 2016 ICC World Twenty20 in India. She captained Ireland in 62 matches across all formats of the games including two ICC Women's World Twenty20 tournaments.

In June 2018, she was named in Ireland's squad for the 2018 ICC Women's World Twenty20 Qualifier tournament. In October 2018, she was named in Ireland's squad for the 2018 ICC Women's World Twenty20 tournament in the West Indies. The following month, she was named the Female Club Player of the Year at the annual Cricket Ireland Awards.

Family
Joyce is one of nine children of James "Jimmy" and Maureen Joyce. Joyce comes from a cricketing family. Her twin sister Cecelia has also played for the Irish women's team, whilst three of her brothers, Dominick, Ed and Gus have all played for the Ireland men's team. Ed has also played cricket for England. Her mother Maureen was a cricket scorer. She was also scorer in two WODIs in 2002 when New Zealand women toured to Netherlands and Ireland.

Isobel married former Irish cricketer John Anderson. Thus they became one of the very few cricketing couples to play international cricket.

Field hockey
In 2009–10, together with her sister Cecelia, Kate McKenna, Emer Lucey and Nicola Evans, Joyce was a member of the Railway Union team that won the Women's Irish Hockey League title.

References

External links

1983 births
Living people
Irish women cricketers
Ireland women Test cricketers
Ireland women One Day International cricketers
Ireland women Twenty20 International cricketers
Sportspeople from County Wicklow
Irish twins
Twin sportspeople
Irish women cricket captains
Scorchers (women's cricket) cricketers
Tasmanian Tigers (women's cricket) cricketers
Hobart Hurricanes (WBBL) cricketers
Irish female field hockey players
Railway Union field hockey players
Women's Irish Hockey League players
Iso